P. J. Smyth (born 1948 in Tuam, County Galway) is an Irish former Gaelic footballer who played for his local club Tuam Stars and at senior level for the Galway county team from 1971 until 1972. Smyth has the distinction of being the very first football All-Star goalkeeper.

References

1948 births
Living people
All Stars Awards winners (football)
Gaelic football goalkeepers
Galway inter-county Gaelic footballers
Tuam Stars Gaelic footballers